Pill is a municipality in the Schwaz district in the Austrian state of Tyrol.

Geography
Pill lies in the Lower Inn Valley near Schwaz.

References

Cities and towns in Schwaz District